Kvaløya is a large island in Troms og Finnmark county, Norway. The  island is located in Hammerfest Municipality. The town of Hammerfest is located in the western shore of the island. Other villages on the island include Forsøl, Rypefjord, and Stallogargo.

The island is connected to the mainland via Norwegian National Road 94 which crosses the Kvalsund Bridge in the southern part of the island. Most of the settlements on the island are on the western shore along the highway 94. There is a ferry connection between Kvaløya and the island of Seiland to the southwest.

See also
List of islands of Norway

References

Hammerfest
Islands of Troms og Finnmark